James Ernest Lane FRCS (24 July 1857 – 4 November 1926) was a British surgeon.  He was head surgeon at St Mary's Hospital, London from 1904 to 1922.  He was the son of James R. Lane and grandnephew of Samuel Armstrong Lane.

References 
 
 LANE, James Ernest’,   Who Was Who,  A & C Black,   1920–2008;     online edn,   Oxford University Press, Dec 2007       accessed 19 Feb 2012 
 http://livesonline.rcseng.ac.uk/biogs/E002471b.htm

1857 births
1926 deaths
British surgeons
Fellows of the Royal College of Surgeons